Anne de Laval may refer to:

Anne de Laval (1505–1554), daughter of Guy XVI de Laval
Anne de Laval (1385–1466), wife of Guy XIII de Laval
Or one of the other daughters of the House of Laval